Ro-Zangelo Daal (born 10 February 2004) is a Dutch footballer who plays for Jong AZ.

Career
After moving across from DVC Buiksloot in 2015 to the Alkmaar academy, Daal signed a contract with AZ in the summer of 2021. His form for the AZ youth sides saw him being offered a new and extended contract in March 2022 to keep him in Alzmaar until 2025. Daal has been tipped as a "wonderkid" in the football management computer game Football Manager in both 2021 and 2022. 

Daal made his debut for Jong AZ against  Jong PSV in a home 2–0 win in the Eerste Divisie on 1 April 2022. Daal scored his first senior league goal on February 3, 2023 in a 4-3 win against VVV Venlo.

International career
Daal scored for the Dutch under-18 national side in a 5–0 win over Italy under-18s in September 2021.

References

External links
 

Living people
2004 births
Dutch footballers
Eerste Divisie players
Jong AZ players